Ad Abi Karam (born 28 March 1937 in Kornet Chehwan, Matn District, Lebanon) is a retired Lebanese Australian Maronite Catholic bishop of the Maronite Catholic Eparchy of Saint Maron of Sydney.

Life
Ordained to the priesthood on 25 March 1962, Karam was appointed on 26 October 2001 bishop by Pope John Paul II of the Maronite Eparchy of Saint Maron of Sydney, Australia. Maronite Patriarch of Antioch, Cardinal Nasrallah Boutros Sfeir, on January 12, 2002, ordained him bishop and his co-consecrators were Roland Aboujaoudé, auxiliary bishop of Antioch, and Samir Mazloum, Curial Bishop of Antioch. He was installed as bishop on February 8, 2002.

Karam had his age-related renounce of his office on 17 April 2013 accepted by Pope Francis.

References

External links

 http://www.gcatholic.org/dioceses/diocese/zmar1.htm

1937 births
Lebanese clergy
Living people
21st-century Maronite Catholic bishops
People from Matn District
Lebanese Eastern Catholic bishops